Wu Yundong is a Chinese chemist. He is a theoretical organic chemist based in the Hong Kong University of Science and Technology and holds a concurrent position in Peking University. He was born 10 May 1957 in Liyang, Jiangsu, China. He graduated with a BS from Lanzhou University in 1982 and received his PhD in 1986 from the University of Pittsburgh, working with Kendall N. Houk in computational organic chemistry. He went on to become a research associate in University of California Los Angeles from 1989 to 1992, before beginning his independent research career in Hong Kong.

Professor Wu has received numerous awards in his career; in December 2005, he was elected as an Academician of the prestigious Chinese Academy of Sciences. His research interest focuses mainly on the elucidation of reaction mechanisms, protein-protein interactions/aggregations (Alzheimer's disease etc.) and conformational features of natural and unnatural peptides.

External links
 Curriculum Vitae from Peking University College of Chemistry 

1957 births
Living people
Academic staff of Chongqing University
Computational chemists
Educators from Changzhou
Academic staff of the Hong Kong University of Science and Technology
Lanzhou University alumni
Members of the Chinese Academy of Sciences
Organic chemists
Academic staff of Peking University
People from Liyang
Scientists from Changzhou
University of Pittsburgh alumni